The slender snake eel (Scolecenchelys macroptera, also known as the narrow worm eel) is an eel in the family Ophichthidae (worm/snake eels). It was described by Pieter Bleeker in 1857. It is a marine, tropical eel which is known from the Indo-Pacific, including East Africa, the Society Islands, the Ryukyu Islands, and the Great Barrier Reef.

References

Fish described in 1857
Scolecenchelys